Gregory Walter Rigters (February 26, 1985 – December 4, 2017) was a Surinamese footballer. 

Rigters last played as a forward for Walking Boyz Company in the Hoofdklasse, and for the Suriname national team. He died following a traffic collision on December 4, 2017.

Career 
Rigters began his career in the 2007–08 SVB Hoofdklasse, playing for SV Voorwaarts. After two seasons he transferred to SV The Brothers returning to his former club after two seasons. In 2013, he transferred to Walking Boyz Company finishing his first season at his new club as the league top goal scorer with 16 goals, Rigters would finish as the league's top goal scorer once more with 20 goals scored the following season.

International career 
Rigters played for the Suriname national team having made his debut on 22 April 2009 in a friendly match against French Guiana which ended in a 0–0 draw. He scored his only goal for the national team on 30 April 2015 in a friendly match against Guyana.

References

External links 
 

1985 births
2017 deaths
Sportspeople from Paramaribo
Surinamese footballers
Suriname international footballers
SVB Eerste Divisie players
S.V. Voorwaarts players
S.V. Walking Boyz Company players
Association football forwards
Road incident deaths in Suriname